Adampol  is a village in the administrative district of Gmina Korytnica, within Węgrów County, Masovian Voivodeship, in East-Central Poland.

The village has a population of 54.

References

Villages in Węgrów County